Puerto Rico competed at the 2015 World Aquatics Championships in Kazan, Russia from 24 July to 9 August 2015.

Diving

Puerto Rican divers qualified for the individual spots and synchronized teams at the World Championships.

Men

Women

Swimming

Puerto Rican swimmers have achieved qualifying standards in the following events (up to a maximum of 2 swimmers in each event at the A-standard entry time, and 1 at the B-standard):

Men

References

External links
FPN web site 

Nations at the 2015 World Aquatics Championships
2015 in Puerto Rican sports
Puerto Rico at the World Aquatics Championships